"Weak" is a song by American indie pop band AJR. It was first released on their EP What Everyone's Thinking on September 16, 2016, by their own label AJR Productions, and was later featured on their second studio album The Click (2017).

Background
In an interview, the band explained that the song is about balancing the need to give in to temptation with the importance of staying strong and resisting an urge. This song is about a guy who tells himself that he will stop his bad habits such as drinking and smoking because it increases the likelihood of his bad behavior. However, things are harder than they seem and he can't refuse the bad offer when it hits him at the moment, he caves in and ultimately gives in.

Music videos
"Weak" was accompanied by a lyric video afterwards as a single release on October 20, 2016. A music video for the song was released on March 9, 2017, and has 74 million views as of February 9, 2022. The video depicts the group unconscious on a train with Jack Met waking up and struggling to traverse and leave. As he does so, Ryan and Adam appear in and out behind him performing their instruments. Jack finally walks towards the light at the end of the train and suddenly finds himself standing directly on the train track. He turns around just as a train barrels down the track and hits him.

Chart performance
After the release of its lyric video, the song debuted on the Swedish chart at number 88, and at number 81 in Switzerland. It also entered the top 100 in Austria, Italy, Canada, and the United Kingdom. In the Benelux, The Netherlands, Belgium and Luxembourg. The song was used multiple times in the television show: "Temptation Island".

Track listing

Charts

Weekly charts

Year-end charts

Certifications

Weak (Stay Strong Mix)

An official remix of the song, titled "Weak (Stay Strong Mix)", was released on April 28, 2017. This version of the song features vocals from English singer-songwriter Louisa Johnson. The remix charted on Tophit's Russia Airplay chart, peaking at number 6.

Track listing

Charts

References

AJR (band) songs
2016 songs
2016 singles